Epermenia conioptila is a moth in the family Epermeniidae. It was described by Edward Meyrick in 1921. It is found in Kenya and South Africa.

References

Epermeniidae
Moths described in 1921
Lepidoptera of Kenya
Lepidoptera of South Africa
Moths of Africa